Humberto Saavedra Araújo (born 3 August 1923, date of death unknown) was a Bolivian football midfielder who played for Bolivia in the 1950 FIFA World Cup. He also played for The Strongest. Saavedra is deceased.

References

1923 births
Year of death missing
Bolivian footballers
Bolivia international footballers
Association football midfielders
The Strongest players
1950 FIFA World Cup players